The 2003 season is the Philadelphia Charge's third and final season competing in the Women's United Soccer Association league, the top division of women's soccer in the United States. The team was coached by  Mark Krikorian.

Review

Club

Roster
The first-team roster of Philadelphia Charge.

Team management
{| class="wikitable" style="text-align:left;"
|-
! style="background:#da2736; color:#fff; border:2px solid #041c2c;"|Position
! style="background:#da2736; color:#fff; border:2px solid #041c2c;"|Staff Member
|-
| Head Coach ||  Mark Krikorian
|-
| Goalkeeping Coach ||  Paul Royal

Competition

Regular season

Results by round

Home/away results

Regular-season standings

Statistics

Players without any appearance are not included.

|-
|colspan="14"|Goalkeepers:
|-

|-
|colspan="14"|Defenders:
|-

|-
|colspan="14"|Midfielders:
|-

|-
|colspan="14"|Forwards:
|-

Goalkeepers

Record = W-L-D

Transfers

In

Out

References

External links
 Philadelphia Charge website (archive.org)

Philadelphia Charge
2003 in Philadelphia
American soccer clubs 2003 season
2003 in American sports
2003 Women's United Soccer Association season
Sports in Pennsylvania by year